Charles Lee "June" Henley, Jr. (born September 4, 1975) is a former professional American football running back in the National Football League. He played one season for the St. Louis Rams (1998).

Early years
At Brookhaven High School, Henley played along with Terry Glenn of the New England Patriots, the Green Bay Packers, and the Dallas Cowboys, and Shawn Harris a University of Hawaii standout.

College
Henley played collegiately at the University of Kansas.

NFL
He was drafted in the fifth round of the 1997 NFL Draft by the Kansas City Chiefs, but was cut. He joined the Rams practice squad for a year, before joining the full squad for a year. While with the Rams he appeared in eleven games, where he had 88 carries for 313 yards and 3 touchdowns. The following summer, a toe injury effectively ended his career.

Legal trouble
On November 17, 2005, Henley was arrested in Columbus for participating in a burglary. After pleading guilty to aggravated robbery and aggravated burglary, he was sentenced to four years in prison.

Later on September 26, 2013, Henley was arrested again for theft when he was caught on video surveillance stealing from a Walmart. He has yet to stand trial and has only been accused at this time.

References

1975 births
Living people
Players of American football from Columbus, Ohio
American football running backs
Kansas Jayhawks football players
St. Louis Rams players